The town of Wächtersbach is part of the Main-Kinzig-Kreis in Hesse, Germany. In 1982, the town hosted the 22nd Hessentag state festival.

Location

Wächtersbach lies between the Spessart and the Vogelsberg Mountains in the middle Kinzig valley at the edge of the Büdingen Forest, not far from the towns of Gelnhausen, Birstein, Bad Orb and Bad Soden-Salmünster.

Neighbouring communities
To the north, Wächtersbach borders on the communities of Kefenrod (Wetteraukreis) and Brachttal. To the east it abuts the town of Bad Soden-Salmünster, and in the south the town of Bad Orb and the community of Biebergemünd. In the west it borders the community of Gründau.

Economy
Wächtersbach is well known for its retail fair, the Wächtersbacher Messe, held yearly for end customers in the week around Ascension Day. Retail business and the electrical engineering industry underpin the town's economic life. Over the last few years, many shops have located in Wächtersbach bringing many people in from outlying towns and communities to do their shopping.

The town is famous for the brightly colored porcelain coffee cups and other dinnerware that are made there at the Wächtersbach Ceramic Factory, founded in 1832 (Although the manufacture of some of the coffee cups and dinnerware are now outsourced to Spain).
The Wächtersbach Ceramic Factory coffee cups are noted for being superbly designed—they have unusually thick circular porcelain walls that allow them to keep the coffee (or tea or hot chocolate) hot longer than regular coffee cups. They also have larger than normal handles, making them easy to grasp.

Sports and leisure
 Heated open-air swimming pool
 48 km marked hiking trails
 Bowling
 Bicycle rental
 Tennis courts
 Horseback riding
 Angling
 Südbahn bicycle path

Infrastructure
The Kinzig Valley Railway with the Wächtersbach station leads through the town.

References

External links 

 Website Wächtersbach (in German)

Towns in Hesse
Main-Kinzig-Kreis